Mikheil Alania is a Georgian rugby union player. He plays as Scrum-half for Jiki Gori in the Didi 10. He was called into the Georgia U20 squad for 2018 World Rugby Under 20 Championship.

References

2000 births
Living people
Rugby union players from Georgia (country)
Rugby union scrum-halves